The Leicestershire Senior League (currently sponsored by Everards Brewery) is a football competition based in Leicestershire, England.

History

The league was formed in 1896, had a two-year hiatus between 1901 and 1903, and has run continuously since 1903 apart from during the two world wars and a four-year spell in the 1930s. A second division was added in 1948.

The longest serving team in the league was Holwell Sports, who completed 76 seasons in the league, 60 of them in the top division but left in 2008 to join the new East Midlands Counties Football League.

Current structure
The league currently has three divisions, the Premier Division, Division One and Division Two (increased from 2 divisions ahead of the 2018–19 season), and is a feeder to the United Counties League. It fed the East Midlands Counties Football League until its dissolution in 2021. The Football Association classified the Leicestershire Senior League Premier Division as Step 7, due to the quality of football played and the standard of the grounds on which teams play. The First Division is therefore not part of the NLS, meaning that clubs in that division are not eligible to take part in the FA Vase. An application to re-grade the Premier Division to Step 6 was turned down by the FA in 2006. Step 7 was later abolished and the Premier Division was re-classified as an NLS county feeder.

For the 2008–09 season, eight of the leading sides left the league to join forces with eight clubs from the Central Midlands League to form a new league, the East Midlands Counties Football League, at Step 6 of the National League System. That league is now defunct.

Champions
The champions of the league's top division since its creation have been as follows:

1896–97 Leicester Fosse Reserves
1897–98 Hinckley Town
1898–99 Swadlincote Town
1899–1900 Hinckley Town
1900–01 Gresley Rovers
1903–04 Loughborough Corinthians
1904–05 Leicester Fosse Reserves
1905–06 Leicester Fosse Reserves
1906–07 Leicester Fosse Reserves
1907–08 Coalville Town
1908–09 Hinckley United
1909–10 Hinckley United
1910–11 Shepshed Albion
1911–12 Holwell Works
1912–13 Loughborough Corinthians
1913–14 Hinckley United
1914–15 Whitwick Imps
1915–16 Coalville Swifts
1918–19 Coalville Swifts
1919–20 Whitwick Imps
1920–21 Shepshed Albion
1921–22 Whitwick Imps
1922–23 Whitwick Imps
1923–24 Ashby Town
1924–25 Whitwick Imps
1925–26 Barwell United
1926–27 Mountsorrel Town
1927–28 Burton Town Reserves
1928–29 Burton Town Reserves
1929–30 Burton Town Reserves
1934–35 New Lount Colliery
1935–36 HM Mansfields Sports
1936–37 Loughborough Brush
1937–38 HM Mansfields Sports
1938–39 Donisthorpe

1948–49 Coalville Town
1949–50 Nuneaton Borough Reserves
1950–51 Quorn Methodists
1951–52 Anstey Nomads
1952–53 Measham Imperial
1953–54 Anstey Nomads
1954–55 Leicester City 'A'
1955–56 Whitwick Colliery Reserves
1956–57 Leicester City 'A'
1957–58 Leicester City 'A'
1958–59 Stapenhill
1959–60 Stapenhill
1960–61 Whitwick Colliery
1961–62 Syston St Peters
1962–63 Enderby Town
1963–64 Oadby Town
1964–65 Enderby Town
1965–66 Newfoundpool WMC
1966–67 Enderby Town
1967–68 Oadby Town
1968–69 Oadby Town
1969–70 Newfoundpool WMC
1970–71 Friar Lane Old Boys
1971–72 Friar Lane Old Boys
1972–73 Oadby Town
1973–74 Friar Lane Old Boys
1974–75 Friar Lane Old Boys
1975–76 Friar Lane Old Boys
1976–77 Friar Lane Old Boys
1977–78 Friar Lane Old Boys
1978–79 Shepshed Charterhouse
1979–80 Shepshed Charterhouse
1980–81 Shepshed Charterhouse
1981–82 Anstey Nomads
1982–83 Anstey Nomads
1983–84 Melton Town
1984–85 Thringstone
1985–86 Thringstone
1986–87 Stapenhill
1987–88 Holwell Works
1988–89 Stapenhill
1989–90 St Andrews SC
1990–91 Lutterworth Town
1991–92 Holwell Sports
1992–93 Holwell Sports
1993–94 St Andrews SC
1994–95 Oadby Town
1995–96 St Andrews SC
1996–97 Oadby Town
1997–98 Oadby Town
1998–99 Oadby Town
1999–2000 Highfield Rangers
2000–01 Quorn
2001–02 Coalville Town
2002–03 Coalville Town
2003–04 Loughborough Dynamo
2004–05 Thurnby Rangers
2005–06 Friar Lane & Epworth
2006–07 Stapenhill
2007–08 Kirby Muxloe SC
2008–09 Anstey Nomads
2009–10 Thurmaston Town
2010–11 Ashby Ivanhoe
2011–12 Rothley Imperial
2012–13 Rothley Imperial
2013–14 Allexton & New Parks
2014–15 Sileby Town
2015–16 Birstall United
2016–17 Lutterworth Town
2017–18 Ingles
2018–19 Rugby Borough

2022–23 members

Premier Division (17 teams)
Allexton & New Parks
Asfordby
Blaby & Whetstone
Burbage & Huncote
Cottesmore AFC
Desford & Caterpillar
Ellistown
FC Khalsa GAD
Friar Lane & Epworth
Glenfield United
Hathern
Highfield Rangers
Magna 73
Northfield Emerald
ProChance Football Club
Sileby Town
Thurnby Rangers

Division One (15 teams)
AFC North Kilworth
Anstey Town
Ashby Ivanhoe Knights
Aylestone Park Reserves
Barlestone St Giles
Barrow Town Reserves
Birstall United Social Reserves
Dunton & Broughton United
Earl Shilton Albion
Fleckney Athletic
Holwell Sports Reserves
Ingles Reserves
Kibworth Town
Kirby Muxloe Reserves
Sporting Markfield

Division Two (13 teams)
Anstey Nomads Reserves
Blaby & Whetstone Reserves
Bottesford
Desford & Caterpillar Reserves
Hinckley LRFC Reserves
Leicester Atletico
Loughborough
Lutterworth Town Reserves
Rothley Imperial
Rugby Borough Development
Sileby Town Reserves
St Andrews Reserves
Sutton Bonington

References

External links
LSL Premier Division at nonleaguematters.co.uk
LSL Division 1 at nonleaguematters.co.uk
LSL at Full-Time TheFA.com

 
1896 establishments in England
Football in Leicestershire
Football leagues in England
Sports leagues established in 1896